A by-election was held in the New South Wales state electoral district of Monaro on 18 July 1884. No poll was held as David Ryrie was the only candidate nominated. The by-election was triggered by the resignation of Robert Tooth.

Dates

Result

Robert Tooth resigned.

References

New South Wales state by-elections
1884 elections in Australia
1880s in New South Wales